Fear Itself is an American horror-suspense anthology television series. It debuted on NBC on June 5, 2008, but was pulled from the air after late July 2008, with five episodes remaining unaired by NBC. On March 13, 2009, it was confirmed that the series had been canceled and would not return to NBC.

Production and development
Its title is derived from the famous Franklin D. Roosevelt quote, "The only thing we have to fear is fear itself." The anthology was born out of Masters of Horror and shares several of the same creative elements.  It features self-contained horror/thriller stories directed by the biggest horror directors working in features today, both shows were created by Mick Garris, and both shows are produced by Industry Entertainment's Andrew Deane, Adam Goldworm and Ben Browning. Stuart Gordon, Brad Anderson, John Landis, Ernest Dickerson and Rob Schmidt all directed at least one episode of each series.

The series was filmed in the city of Edmonton, Alberta, Canada, with some additional filming taking place in the city of St. Albert and the town of Devon, Alberta. Guest stars included Eric Roberts, Anna Kendrick, Brandon Routh,josie Davis ,Briana Evigan, Jesse Plemons, Elisabeth Moss, and Cory Monteith. The song in the opening credits is titled "Lie Lie Lie" by System of a Down frontman Serj Tankian, from his first solo album Elect the Dead.

Broadcast
The show aired Thursday nights at 10/9c. It was put on hiatus for the duration of the 2008 Summer Olympics, with the promise of a return once the event was over, but no further episodes were aired. While NBC failed to comment on the fate of the series once the Olympics ended, its time-slot was thereafter filled with re-runs of other NBC shows, and "Fear Itself" did not appear on the NBC Fall 2008 schedule.

In the UK, the show started airing on 5* from Friday 4 May 2012. In Australia, the show commenced screening in August 2012 on the FX channel, available on the Foxtel platform.

Home media
The complete series was released on DVD on September 15, 2009.

Episodes
The episodes are run in a different order on the DVD and within online streaming sites.

References

External links

Fear Itself Directors, Writers and Stars Announced

2000s American horror television series
2000s American anthology television series
2008 American television series debuts
2008 American television series endings
American horror fiction television series
English-language television shows
Horror anthologies
NBC original programming
Television shows filmed in Edmonton
Television series by Lionsgate Television